The Worcester Railers (also called Worcester Railers HC) are a professional ice hockey team based in Worcester, Massachusetts. The team began play in the 2017–18 ECHL season, and is a member of the North Division of the Eastern Conference of the ECHL. The team plays their home games at the DCU Center and are the ECHL affiliate of the New York Islanders. The team filled the void left by the AHL's Worcester Sharks, who relocated to San Jose, California, in 2015 to become the San Jose Barracuda.

History
On January 26, 2015, it was reported that the Worcester Sharks would move to San Jose and share SAP Center at San Jose with their parent club, the San Jose Sharks. These reports were confirmed with the Sharks' official announcement on January 29. Worcester did not initially receive an ECHL team to replace the relocated AHL team, unlike the other markets with relocated AHL teams in 2015, such as Manchester, New Hampshire; Norfolk, Virginia; and Glens Falls, New York.

On February 8, 2016, the ECHL announced that Worcester would be home to an expansion team, set to begin play for the 2017–18 season. The team is owned by Cliff Rucker, with Toby O'Brien initially serving as president and general manager (although O'Brien would leave in May 2016 for an NHL job and replaced by former Worcester Sharks executive, Mike Myers, as president). The team is the ECHL's first franchise in Massachusetts and second in New England after the Manchester Monarchs. Early reports indicated that ownership group was considering Whitehawks, Railers, and Blast as the name of the team. The team unveiled their name and logo on April 3. On September 12, 2016, Jamie Russell was announced as the team's first head coach and general manager. He had served as head coach of the Elmira Jackals from 2014 to 2016. The team announced their first affiliation with the New York Islanders (NHL) and Bridgeport Islanders (AHL) at the end of the 2016–17 season.

The Railers played their first game on October 14, 2017, defeating the Monarchs 4–3 at the DCU Center in front of a crowd of 12,135. The first goal scored in franchise history was by forward Wade Murphy. The Railers qualified for the playoffs in their first season, losing to the Adirondack Thunder in the first round. They finished last in the competitive North Division in the 2018–19 season. The Railers then started the 2019–20 season with four wins in their first 15 games and fired head coach Jamie Russell. He was replaced by David Cunniff, who had been serving as an assistant with the Hartford Wolf Pack in the AHL.

Due to the COVID-19 pandemic, the Railers voluntarily suspended operations for the 2020–21 ECHL season.

Season-by-season records

Players

Current roster 
As of November 29, 2022.

References

External links
Worcester Railers HC (Official website)
 

 
2016 establishments in Massachusetts
ECHL teams
Ice hockey clubs established in 2016
Ice hockey teams in Worcester, Massachusetts
New York Islanders minor league affiliates